Dream All Day: The Best of the Posies is a compilation album by Seattle alternative rock band The Posies, released in 2000. This album was compiled with Ken Stringfellow and Jon Auer's full participation, but only collected songs from their successful and influential years on the Geffen and DGC labels.

Track listing

Personnel 
Jon Auer    - Lead vocals and guitar
Ken Stringfellow - Lead vocals, guitar and keyboards
Arthur "Rick" Roberts - Bass
Dave Fox - Bass
Joe Skyward - Bass
Mike Musburger - Drums
Brian Young - Drums

2000 greatest hits albums
The Posies albums
Geffen Records compilation albums